Edmund Siegfried Valtman (May 31, 1914 – January 12, 2005) was an Estonian and American editorial cartoonist and winner of the 1962 Pulitzer Prize for Editorial Cartooning.

Born in Tallinn, Estonia, he sold his first cartoons at age 15 to the children's magazine Laste Rõõm. He worked as an editorial cartoonist for the newspapers Eesti Sõna and Maa Sõna and studied at the Tallinn Art and Applied Art School. When the USSR reoccupied Estonia in 1944, he and his wife fled the country and spent the next four years in a displaced persons camp in Germany, which was still under the control of Allied occupation forces. They emigrated to the United States in 1949.

Once in the US, Valtman worked for The Hartford Times from 1951 until his 1975 retirement. He was noted for his caricatures of Cold War-era communist leaders like Nikita Khrushchev and Leonid Brezhnev. He won the Pulitzer Prize for his August 31, 1961 cartoon. It showed Fidel Castro leading a shackled, beaten-down man representing Cuba and advising Brazil "What You Need, Man, Is a Revolution Like Mine!"

Valtman died in a Bloomfield, Connecticut retirement home.

Footnotes

External links
 
 "Edmund Valtman: The Cartoonist Who Came in from the Cold" – Library of Congress

1914 births
2005 deaths
Artists from Tallinn
20th-century Estonian male artists
Estonian cartoonists
People from the Governorate of Estonia
American editorial cartoonists
Estonian emigrants to the United States
Estonian World War II refugees
Pulitzer Prize for Editorial Cartooning winners